Tiago Machowski (born 16 May 1993) is a Brazilian professional footballer who plays as a goalkeeper for Santa Cruz.

Career
Born in Rio Azul, Tiago Machowski went through a period of testing in the academy of Grêmio in 2008, having been approved. Since then, he joined the youth teams of the club, until he was promoted to the first team squad for the 2014 season. He made his professional debut on 16 March, in a 3–0 home won against Pelotas, by the Campeonato Gaúcho. In October 2014, Tiago received two opportunities to start the match as the holder Marcelo Grohe was called to the Brazilian national team. He excelled in these two matches, gaining confidence in the club.

Career statistics

References

External links
Tiago Machowski profile. Portal Oficial do Grêmio.

1993 births
Living people
Brazilian footballers
Campeonato Brasileiro Série A players
Grêmio Foot-Ball Porto Alegrense players
Association football goalkeepers